The Nagler-Rolz NR 54 is an Austrian experimental foldable backpack helicopter developed during World War II.  An enlarged variant, the NR 55, was also built.

Design and development 
The NR 54 was developed by Austrian engineers Bruno Nagler and Franz Rolz.  The helicopter featured a three-legged undercarriage design and a single seat.  The NR 54 V1 prototype featured a single-bladed rotor, while the V2 prototype had a more traditional two-bladed unit.  Both prototypes were powered by a piston engines mounted on the rotor blades, with the V1 having a single  engine driving two contra-rotating propellers, and the V2 having two  single-cylinder variants of the Argus As 8.  This configuration eliminated torque, negating the need for a tail rotor.

The enlarged NR 55 a proof of concept aircraft based on the configuration of the NR 54 V1 and was powered by a 40 hp engine in an aerodynamic fairing.

Operational history 
The NR 55 was the first airframe built, and conducted a successful hover during indoor testing.  Centrifugal forces on the engine caused fuel flow problems, which in turn led to vibration problems, and the propellers created a gyroscopic effect which interfered with the flapping hinges of the rotor.  These problems were not fixed on the NR 54 V1 and V2, which were not flown before testing was halted by the Soviet advance in Vienna.

Nagler evaded the Red Army and was interviewed by the British after the war.  The NR 54 V1 remained in Austria, while the V2 was captured by American forces after the war, who evaluated it at Freeman Army Airfield. The NR 55 had been destroyed by an Allied bombing raid in 1944.

Variants 
NR 54 V1
First prototype with a single-bladed rotor.
NR 54 V2
Second prototype with a two-bladed rotor.
NR 55
Enlarged proof of concept prototype.

Survivors 
The NR 54 V2 is currently on display at the Steven F. Udvar-Hazy Center in Chantilly, Virginia.

Specifications (NR 54 V2)

See also

References 

1940s Austrian experimental aircraft
1940s Austrian helicopters
Twin-engined piston helicopters
Single-engined piston helicopters